José Félix Gallastegi Bilbao (born 7 July 1966) is a Spanish retired football manager and former player who played as a midfielder. He is the current kit manager of Bilbao Athletic.

Gallastegi appeared in nearly 100 Segunda División matches for SD Eibar and Sestao Sport Club, scoring four goals. As a manager, he was notably in charge of SD Amorebieta in Segunda División B.

References

External links

1966 births
Living people
Spanish footballers
Sportspeople from Biscay
Footballers from the Basque Country (autonomous community)
Association football midfielders
Segunda División players
Segunda División B players
Tercera División players
SD Lemona footballers
SD Eibar footballers
Sestao Sport Club footballers
Real Murcia players
SD Amorebieta footballers
Spanish football managers
Segunda División B managers
Tercera División managers
SD Amorebieta managers